Tai Seng MRT station is an underground Mass Rapid Transit (MRT) station on the Circle line, situated along the boundary of Hougang and Toa Payoh planning areas, Singapore.

Located underneath Upper Paya Lebar Road near the junction of MacPherson Road and Airport Road, Tai Seng station was named after and primarily serves the industrial clusters at Tai Seng, which in turn means "big accomplishment" in Chinese. The name was first used on a rubber factory constructed in the area in 1917.

History

Upper Paya Lebar Road was realigned from Kim Chuan Road to Jalan Bunga Rampai on 14 April 2003 for the construction of the station. The station was completed in November 2007.

Before the station was built, it was tentatively named Upper Paya Lebar. It was renamed to Tai Seng to reflect the location of the area.

The station was opened on 17 April 2010 along with the rest of Stage 1 & 2 of the Circle line.

On 16 May 2017, it was announced that Tai Seng MRT station on the Circle line will be linked by an underground walkway to the bustling Paya Lebar industrial and commercial hub called 18 Tai Seng on the other side of the road. The station was the only station on the eastern stretch of the line that did not have an underground link to the other side of Upper Paya Lebar Road, where 18 Tai Seng, J'Forte, Sakae Building, BreadTalk IHQ, RE&S Building, Charles & Keith Building and Jackson Design Hub (Tupperware) are located. Work on the new Exit C leading to the underground walkway started in March 2015 and was completed on 7 December 2017. The new exit comes with escalators and a lift for pedestrians' use.

References

External links
 
 

Railway stations in Singapore opened in 2010
Paya Lebar
Mass Rapid Transit (Singapore) stations